Stobrawa Landscape Park (Stobrawski Park Krajobrazowy) is a protected area (Landscape Park) in south-western Poland, established in 1999, covering an area of  in the region of the Stobrawa river.

The Park lies within Opole Voivodeship: in Brzeg County (Gmina Lewin Brzeski, Gmina Lubsza), Kluczbork County (Gmina Kluczbork, Gmina Lasowice Wielkie, Gmina Wołczyn), Namysłów County (Gmina Pokój, Gmina Świerczów) and Opole County (Gmina Dąbrowa, Gmina Dobrzeń Wielki, Gmina Łubniany, Gmina Murów, Gmina Popielów).

References 

Stobrawa
Parks in Opole Voivodeship